Black Widow Records is an Italian record label founded in Genoa in 1990 and taking its name from the British progressive rock band Black Widow. It was originally a rarities shop focusing on collectable records and reissues. After a few years they began to release records, at first concentrating on reissuing rare records but then began to release new albums by contemporary bands.

Discography
BWR001 Crystal Phoenix - Crystal Phoenix CD/LP
BWR002 Men of Lake - Looking for the Sun Box LP
BWR003 Malombra - Malombra CD/LP
BWR004 Runaway Totem - Trimegisto CD/LP
BWR005 Dunwich - Sul Monte è il Tuono CD/LP
BWR006 Presence - The Sleeper Awakes CD
BWR007 Standarte - Standarte CD/LP
BWR008 The Black - Refugium Peccatorum LP
BWR009 Malombra - Our Lady of the Bones CD/2LP
BWR010 Beggars Farm - Beneath the Moon of Ilsacon LP
BWR011 Abiogenesi - Abiogenesi CD/LP
BWR012 Darxtar - Sju CD/LP
BWR013 Runaway Totem - Zed CD/LP
BWR014 Presence - Black Opera CD/2LP
BWR015 Standarte - Curses and Invocations CD/LP
BWR016 The Black - Apocalypsis CD/LP
BWR017 Il Segno del Comando - Il Segno del Comando CD/LP
BWR018 Abiogenesi - Il Giocoscuro CD/LP + Poster
BWR019 Architectural Metaphor - Creature of the Velvet Void CD/LP + Insert
BWR020 ST 37 - Spaceage CD/LP Ltd. 160 gr. + 7" picture sleeve
BWR021 Northwinds - Great God Pan CD/LP Ltd. 160 gr. Gatefold
BWR022 Universal Totem Orchestra - Rituale Alieno CD/LP
BWR023 Rise and Shine - FlowerPowerMetal CD/LP
BWR024 Black Widow - Black Widow IV LP (limited 500 copies)
BWR025 E Tu Vivrai Nel Terrore - Tribute to Horror & Gothic Movies  2CD + book/3LP + book
BWR026 Hawkwind - The Elf & the Hawk CD/2LP
BWR027 Gian Castello - Taliesin CD/LP
BWR028 Standarte - Stimmung CD/LP
BWR029 Black Widow - Return to the Sabbat LP
BWR030 Shine Dion - Killandra LP
BWR031 Pentagram - Review Your Choices LP
BWR032 Ars Nova - The Book of the Dead LP + 12"
BWR033 Alan (The Elf) Davey - Chaos of Delight CD/LP + comic book
BWR034 Akron - La Signora del Buio CD/LP + book
BWR035 Various Artists Blue Explosion: Tribute to Blue Cheer CD/2LP
BWR036 The Black - Golgotha CD/LP
BWR037 Rise and Shine - RoadFlower CD/LP
BWR038 Various Artists Beyond the Realm of Death SS: Tribute to Death SS CD/2LP
BWR039 Various Artists King of the Witches: Tribute to Black Widow CD/2LP
BWR040 Northwinds - Masters of Magic CD/2LP
BWR041 Monument - The First Monument LP
BWR042 Bram Stoker - Heavy Rock Spectacular LP
BWR043 Necromandus - Orexis of Death LP
BWR044 Cirkus - One LP
BWR045 Presence - Gold CD/LP
BWR046 Abiogenesi - Le Notti di Salem CD/LP
BWR047 Simon House - Spiral Galaxy Revisited CD/LP
BWR048 Helden Rune - The Wisdom Through the Fear CD/LP
BWR049 Agony Bag - Feelmazumba CD/LP
BWR050 High Tide - Open Season CD/2LP
BWR051 Jacula - In Cauda Semper Stat Venenum CD/LP
BWR052 Morgan - Nova Solis LP
BWR053 Malombra - The Dissolution Age CD/2LP
BWR054 Various Artists - The Tapestry of Delights CD/2LP
BWR055 Pentagram - Sub-Basement CD/LP
BWR056 Ars Nova - Android Domina LP
BWR057 Il Segno del Comando - Der Golem CD/LP
BWR058 Antonius Rex - Anno Demoni CD/LP + 7"
BWR059 Various Artists - Not of This Earth  3CD + book/4LP + book
BWR060 Simon House/Rod Goodway - House of Dreams CD/LP
BWR061 Ange - Tome 87 LP
BWR062 Sad Minstrel - The Flight of the Phoenix CD/LP
BWR063 Crystal Phoenix - The Legend of the Two Stonedragons CD/LP
BWR064 Manilla Road - Spiral Castle LP
BWR065 Pentagram - A Keg Full of Dynamite CD/LP
BWR066 Antonius Rex - Neque Semper Arcum Tendit Rex CD/LP (Ltd 400)
BWR067 Akron - Il Tempio di Ferro CD/LP + book (ltd 400)
BWR068 ST 37 - Insect Hospital CD/2LP
BWR069 Presence - The Sleeper Awakes + Live CD/2LP
BWR070 Ripper - And the Dead Shall Rise CD/LP
BWR071 Areknames - Areknames CD/LP
BWR072 The Black - Peccatis Nostris/Capistrani Pugnator CD/LP
BWR073 Zess - Et in Arcadia Ego CD/LP
BWR074 Antonius Rex - PraeternaturalCD/LP
BWR075 Various Artist - Daze of the Underground: A Tribute to Hawkwind 3LP Box
BWR076 Wicked Minds - From the Purple Skies CD/2LP
BWR077 Minotauri - Minotauri CD/2LP
BWR078 Pentagram - Show 'Em How CD/LP
BWR079 Death SS - The Horned God of the Witches 2LP
BWR080 Paul Roland - Strychnine...and Other Potent Poisons CD/LP
BWR081 L'Impero Delle Ombre - L'Impero Delle Ombre CD/LP
BWR082 Morticia - Exhumed CD
BWR083 Antonius Rex - Magic Ritual DVD + CD
BWR084 Pagan Altar - Judgement of the Dead LP + book
BWR085 Deep Switch - Nine Inches of God LP
BWR086 Wyxmer - Feudal Throne CD/LP
BWR087 Bedemon - Child of Darkness CD/LP
BWR088 Abiogenesi - Io Sono il Vampiro CD/LP
BWR089 Northwinds - Chimeres CD + DVD/2LP
BWR090 Paul Roland - Pavane 2LP
BWR091 Orne - The Conjuration by the Fire CD/LP
BWR092 Death SS - The Seventh Seal LP
BWR093 Wicked Minds - Witchflower CD + DVD/2LP
BWR094 Areknames - Love Hate Round Trip CD/2LP
BWR095 Goad - In the House of the Dark Shining Dreams CD/2LP
BWR096 Paul Roland Re Animator CD/LP
BWR097 Abysmal Grief - Abysmal Grief/Mors Eleison CD/LP
BWR098 Jet Jaguar - Space Anthem CD/2LP
BWR099 Antonius Rex - Switch on Dark CD/LP
BWR100 Delirium - Vibrazioni Notturne Live CD/2LP
BWR101 Il Bacio della Medusa - Il Bacio della Medusa CD/LP
BWR102 Il Bacio della Medusa - Discesa agl'Inferi d'un Giovane Amante LP
BWR103 Spirits Burning - Alien Injection CD/LP
BWR104 Dr. Hasbeen - Signs 2CD
BWR105 Presence - Evil Rose CD
BWR106 Universal Totem Orchestra - The Magus CD/2LP
BWR107 Pholas Dactylus - Concerto Delle Menti LP
BWR108 Jacula - Tardo Pede in Magiam Versus CD/LP
BWR109 Il Cerchio D'Oro - Il Viaggio Di Colombo CD/LP
BWR110 G.C. Neri - Logos CD
BWR111 Ripper - The Dead Have Rizen LP / CD
BWR112 T.H.C. WITCHFIELD - Sleepless... LP / CD
BWR113 DELIRIUM - Il nome del vento LP / CD
BWR114 SOPHYA BACCINI - Aradia CD
BWR126 ANTONIUS REX Per Viam LP / CD
BWR129 GUDARS SKYMNING Morka Vatten LP
BWR130 L'IMPERO DELLE OMBRE I Compagni di Baal LP / CD
BWR131 PAOLO SIANI & FRIENDS FEAT. NUOVA IDEA Castles, Wings, Stories and Dreams LP / CD
BWR132 THREE MONKS Neogothic Progressive Toccatas LP / CD
BWR133 Arabs in Aspic Strange Frame of Mind CD
BWR134 ORNE The Tree of Life LP / CD
BWR135 JACULA Pre Viam LP / CD
BWR136 WICKED MINDS Visioni, deliri, illusioni - A Tribute to Italian Prog 2LP / CD feat. special guests: Aldo Tagliapietra (Orme), Stefano Lupo Galifi (Museo Rosenbach), Lino Vairetti (Osanna), Martin Grice (Delirium), Antonio Bartoccetti (Jacula/Antonius Rex) and Sophya Baccini
BWR137 HAWKLORDS The Barney Bubbles Memorial Benefit Concert 2LP poster cover
BWR138 NORTHWINDS Winter LP / CD
BWR139 SPETTRI Same LP / CD
BWR140 ANDROMEDA Same LP+7"
BWR141 SANCTA SANCTORUM Black Sun Mini LP / Mini CD
BWR142 THE HOUNDS OF HASSELVANDER The Ninth hour LP / CD
BWR143 SEID The Magic Handshake 2LP / CD
BWR144 DORIS NORTON Raptus LP / CD
BWR145 BLACK WIDOW See's the Light of the Day 2LP+10" / 2CD
BWR146 ELECTRIC SWAN Swirl in Gravity LP / CD
BWR147 PSYCHO PRAXIS - Echoes from the Deep LP / CD
BWR148 CROWNED IN EARTH - A Vortex of Earthly Chimes LP / CD
BWR149 Witche's Brew - Supersonicspeedfreaks LP / CD
BWR155 INGRANAGGI DELLA VALLE - In Hoc Signo LP / CD feat. special guests: Mattias Olsson (Änglagård, White Willow), David Jackson (Van Der Graaf Generator), Angelica Sauprel Scutti
BWR156 DAEMONIA - Dawn of the Dead-Zombi  CD
BWR157 VICTOR PERAINO's KINGDOM COME with ARTHUR BROWN	Journey in Time LP / CD+Dvd
BWR158 DORIS NORTON - Parapsycho LP / CD
BWR159 THREE MONKS - The Legend of the Holy Circle LP
BWR160 IL TEMPIO DELLE CLESSIDRE - Alienatura LP / CD
BWR161 IL SEGNO DEL COMANDO - Il Volto Verde LP / CD
BWR162 SOPHYA BACCINI's ARADIA - Big Red Dragon (William Blake's Visions) 2LP / CD
BWR163 OSANNA Tempo 2DVD + Booklet
BWR164 GLEEMEN - Oltre, Lontano, Lontano… (with Bambi Fossati, Marco Zoccheddu, Maurizio Cassinelli, Angelo Traverso) LP / CD
BWR165 LATTE E MIELE - Passio Secundum Mattheum CD
BWR166 NUOVA IDEA - Live Anthology DVD
BWR167 BLUE DAWN - Cycle of Pain LP / CD
BWR168 IL TEMPIO DELLE CLESSIDRE - Live in Seoul 2DVD
BWR169 SECRET TALES - L'Antico Regno LP / CD
BWR170 ANNOT RHUL - Leviathan LP
BWR171 HIGH TIDE - Interesting Times LP
BWR172 HIGH TIDE - Precious Cargo LP
BWR173 ERRATA CORRIGE - Sigfrid il Drago e altre Storie LP / CD+Dvd
BWR174 SPETTRI - 2073 La Nemica dei Ricordi LP / CD
BWR175 MERRY GO ROUND (ex-Standarte members) - Merry Go Round LP / CD
BWR176 T.H.C. WITCHFIELD - Sabbatai Zevi LP / CD
BWR177 WONDERWORLD (Roberto Tiranti) - Wonderworld LP
BWR178 RIPPER - Third Witness LP / CD
BWR179 NORTHWINDS - Eternal Winter LP / CD
BWR180 DELIRIUM - L'Era della Menzogna LP / CD
BWR181 CHERRY FIVE - Il Pozzo dei Giganti LP / CD
BWR182 GOBLIN REBIRTH - Live 2LP / 2CD / Dvd / Ltd Box 2CD+Dvd
BWR183 LA FABBRICA DELL'ASSOLUTO - L'Ultimo Uomo d'Europa LP / CD
BWR184 GOAD - The Silent Moonchild  LP / CD
BWR185 ARABS IN ASPIC - Victim of Your Father's Agony LP / CD
BWR186 THE HOUNDS OF HASSELVANDER - Ancient Rocks LP / CD
BWR187 LANDSKAP II  LP / CD
BWR188 TRIP - Live 1972 LP
BWR189 BARI WATTS - There was a Time LP
BWR190 PAOLO SIANI feat. NUOVA IDEA - Faces with No Traces LP / CD
BWR191 INGRANAGGI DELLA VALLE - Warm Spaced Blue LP / CD feat. special guests: Fabio Pignatelli (Goblin (band), Cherry Five), Stefano Vicarelli (La Fonderia, La Batteria), Paolo Lucini (Ezra Winston)
BWR192 WONDERWORLD - II
BWR193 SEID - Wettlaufer's Enke LP
BWR194 VANEXA - Too Heavy to Fly LP
BWR195 MUGSHOTS - Something Weird LP / CD
BWR196 CAP with ALVARO FELLA - Coraggio e Mistero 2LP / CD
BWR197 VV.AA. - Bambi Fossati Guitar Fest DVD
BWR198 UNIVERSAL TOTEM ORCHESTRA - Mathematical Mother LP / CD
BWR199 4GOBLIN - Four of a Kind CD
BWR200 VV.AA. - Marc Bolan David Bowie A Tribute to the Madmen Box 3CD
BWR201 IL TEMPIO DELLE CLESSIDRE - Il-ludere LP / CD
BWR202 ELECTRIC SWAN - Windblown 2LP / CD
BWR203 IL SIGILLO DI HORUS - Effimera LP
BWR204 IL CERCHIO D'ORO - Il Fuoco Sotto la Cenere LP / CD
BWR205 CHROMIUM HAWK MACHINE - Annunaki 2CD (Elios Chreed, Nik Turner, Jay Tausig)
BWR206 SEMIRAMIS - Frazz Live DVD+CD
BWR207 HOLLOWSCENE - Hollowscene CD
BWR208 THE BLACK - Requiem MLP
BWR209 THE BLACK - Reliquarium / Infernus, Paradisus et Purgatorium CD
BWR210 FUNGUS FAMILY - The Key of the Garden LP / CD
BWR211 LUCIANO ONETTI - Sonno Profondo O.S.T. LP
BWR212 LUCIANO ONETTI - Francesca O.S.T. LP
BWRCD211-2 LUCIANO ONETTI - Sonno Profondo / Francesca O.S.T. CD
BWR213 VV.AA. - Terror Tales A Tribute to Death SS 4LP / Box 3CD
BWR214 IL SEGNO DEL COMANDO - L'Incanto dello Zero LP / CD
BWR215 PAOLO SIANI ft NUOVA IDEA - The Leprechaun's Pot of Gold LP / CD
BWR216 MYTHOLOGY - The Castle of Crossed Destinies LP / CD
BWR217 GOTHIC STONE - Haereticus Empyreum LP / CD
BWR218 LUCIANO ONETTI - Abrakadabra O.S.T. LP / CD
BWR219 SATURNALIA - Magical Love Pkd / CD
BWR220 METAPHYSICAL ANIMATION - Metaphysical Animation 2LP / CD
BWR221 FREDDY DELIRIO & THE PHANTOMS - The Cross LP / CD
BWR222 LA JANARA - Tenebra CD
BWR223 LATTEMIELE 2.0 - Paganini Experience LP / CD*BWR501 DIST  FLOWER FLESH - Duck in the Box CD
BWR224 MELTING CLOCK - Destinazioni 2LP / CD
BWR225 RUNAWAY TOTEM - Multiversal Matter CD
BWR227 ANNO MUNDI - Land of Legends LP / CD
BWR228 RAMROD - Jet Black LP / CD
BWR229 MELISSA - Midnight Trampoline LP / CD
BWR230 IL GIRO STRANO - Il Pianeta delle Verità 2LP
BWR231 L'IMPERO DELLE OMBRE - Racconti Macabri Vol. III LP / CD
BWR232 LA STANZA DELLE MASCHERE - La Stanza delle Maschere LP / CD
BWR233 KHADAVRA - Hypnagogia 2LP / CD
BWR234 BALLETTO DI BRONZO - The Official Bootleg 2LP / CD
BWR235 THE BLACK - Ars Metal Mentis LP / CD
BWR236 HAWKWIND - Solstice at Stonehenge 1984 2LP / 2CD+DVD

Italian record labels
Record labels established in 1990
Doom metal record labels
Heavy metal record labels